was a JR East railway station located in Kesennuma, Miyagi Prefecture, Japan. It was destroyed by the 2011 Tōhoku earthquake and tsunami and services have now been replaced by a provisional bus rapid transit line.

Lines
Saichi Station was served by the Kesennuma Line, and was located 63.3 rail kilometers from the terminus of the line at Maeyachi Station.

Station layout
Saichi Station had one side platform serving a single bi-directional track. The station was unattended.

History
Saichi Station opened on 20 July 1967. The station was absorbed into the JR East network upon the privatization of the Japan National Railways (JNR) on April 1, 1987. The station was "swept away" save for its platform by the 2011 Tōhoku earthquake and tsunami. Services have now been replaced by a bus rapid transit line.

Surrounding area
Japan National Route 45

External links

  
  video of a train trip from Minami-Kesennuma Station to Rikuzen-Hashikami Station in 2009, passing through Matsuiwa Station and Saichi Station without stopping at around 03:05 minutes and 05:05 minutes, respectively.  Satellite photos (e.g., in Google Maps) showed that large sections of track and railway bridges were severely affected or washed away by the 2011 tsunami.  Minami-Kesennuma Station, Matsuiwa Station and Saichi Station were all badly damaged or destroyed.

Railway stations in Miyagi Prefecture
Kesennuma Line
Railway stations in Japan opened in 1967
Railway stations closed in 2011
Kesennuma